The name FitzThomas or Fitzthomas may refer to one of the following:

Piers FitzThomas Butler of Duiske (d. 1601), illegitimate son of Thomas Butler, 10th Earl of Ormond.
James FitzThomas FitzGerald (d. 1608), the Súgán Earl of Desmond and eldest son of Sir Thomas Fitzgerald, commonly called "Thomas Roe," "Tomás Ruadh" or "Red Thomas"
John FitzThomas FitzGerald, 1st Earl of Kildare, (c. 1250 – d. 10 September 1316), Irish nobleman in the Peerage of Ireland, as 4th Lord of Offaly from 1287 and subsequently as 1st Earl of Kildare from 1316
John FitzThomas FitzGerald, 1st Baron Desmond (d. 1261), grandson of Maurice FitzGerald, Lord of Lanstephan
Maurice FitzThomas FitzGerald, 1st Earl of Desmond (d. 25 January 1356), Irish nobleman in the Peerage of Ireland, Captain of Desmond Castle in Kinsale, so-called ruler of Munster, and for a short time Lord Justice of Ireland
Maurice FitzThomas FitzGerald, 4th Earl of Kildare (d. August 25, 1390), prominent Irish nobleman in the Peerage of Ireland and Lord Justice of Ireland
Hugo Hawksley Fitzthomas Summerson (b. 21 July 1950), British Conservative politician.

Patronymic surnames
Surnames from given names